Goombay Festival may refer to:

 Goombay Festival, held in Coconut Grove, Florida
 Fantasy Fest, held in Key West, Florida

See also
 Goombay, a genre of Bahamian music